The 2002 Coppa Italia Final was the final of the 2001–02 Coppa Italia, the 55th season of the top cup competition in Italian football. The match was played over two legs on 25 April and 10 May 2002 between Juventus and Parma. This was the third Coppa Italia final between these two clubs, after the 1992 and 1995 finals, and the fifth of six major finals between the two sides. The final was won by Parma, who claimed their third Coppa Italia title with an away goals victory after the aggregate score was level at 2–2.

First leg

Second leg

Coppa Italia Finals
Coppa Italia Final 2002
Coppa Italia Final 2002
Coppa Italia Final